Jefferson Lee Louis (born 22 February 1979) is a footballer who plays for as a striker.

A journeyman, he has played for 42 different clubs, being transferred 47 times over a 28-year career. He has played in the English Football League for Oxford United, Bristol Rovers and Mansfield Town and is a former Dominica international. In December 2022 he been loan for his 42th club, joining Slough Town from Thame United.

Early life
Louis was born in Harrow, and raised in Harlesden, London. He and his mother moved to Aylesbury, Buckinghamshire, when he was 17. He played football for local clubs Risborough Rangers, Aylesbury United and Thame United before, in 2001, he was convicted of dangerous driving while disqualified and sentenced to a year's imprisonment. He served six months before being released from Woodhill Prison.

Club career
Louis joined Oxford United on an initial trial basis in February 2002 and impressed suitably to be handed a Football League debut, as a 78th-minute substitute for Dave Savage, in the club's final game of the season: a 2–1 home defeat to Darlington on 20 April 2002. Retained by the club, the following season he attracted much media attention when, having scored the winner in Oxford United's televised FA Cup Second Round clash with Swindon Town, he was captured naked live on television joyously celebrating the U's draw with the club, Arsenal, he supported as a boy. The club would go on to lose the tie, at Highbury, 2–0 with Louis appearing as a 54th-minute substitute. Despite the attention, his manager Ian Atkins felt that he failed to progress in the second half of the season and he was transfer listed at the season's end.

On 31 July 2003 he agreed to join Woking on loan, the deal seeing him sign for one month with immediate recall, then two further months with the option of making the move permanent. He was recalled from the loan on 15 September 2003, and earned a recall to the first team. On 27 August 2004 he joined Gravesend & Northfleet on a month's loan, before being recalled from his loan period on 24 September 2004 to enable him to sign for Forest Green Rovers on a free transfer.

Louis left Forest Green Rovers for Woking on 3 December 2004, the latter paying a nominal fee for his services. He remained at Woking until the end of the 2004–05 season, scoring 3 times in 23 league matches. He made 10 league and cup appearances for Second Division side Bristol Rovers between May and September 2005. After brief spells at Worthing and Stevenage Borough, he signed for Yeading in January 2006. He remained with the club until January 2007 but played only a handful of matches for the club. Louis then spent six months at Havant & Waterlooville and another six months at Weymouth.

Louis spent a brief spell with Maidenhead United before joining Mansfield Town in January 2008 on a three-month contract. He was released on 2 May 2008 and joined Wrexham the following month. His spell at Wrexham was a successful one, scoring 15 goals in 42 appearances in the 2008–09 season. After having his contract with Wrexham terminated by mutual consent, he joined Crawley Town on 24 May 2009. He joined Rushden & Diamonds on loan on 12 November. However, he limped off on his debut after 17 minutes. He did well at Nene Park, and in the last game of his original loan deal he scored twice against Barrow, prompting manager Justin Edinburgh to keep him till the end of the season.

He joined Gainsborough Trinity in June 2010, but in October moved on to Conference National club Darlington on loan until January 2011, with the intention of the deal then being made permanent. The deal fell through, so Louis returned to Gainsborough at the end of the loan. Released by Gainsborough, he played once for former club Weymouth, as a substitute in a 2–1 win at Hemel Hempstead Town, then returned to the Conference with Hayes & Yeading United. Released by Hayes & Yeading at his own request in March, he rejoined Maidenhead United the following day.

After spending the first half of the 2011–12 season with Brackley Town, Louis joined Lincoln City on 31 January 2012. In June 2012 he agreed a deal to rejoin his former Rushden & Diamonds manager Justin Edinburgh at Newport County. In November 2012 he joined Whitehawk on loan until his contract with Newport County expired on 1 January 2013. He then returned to Brackley Town, making his second debut at the turn of the year against Droylsden on 5 January 2013. By the end of the season he had scored 7 goals in 24 Conference North appearances, including the play-offs. He left Brackley at the end of the season and signed for Hendon in July 2013. In February 2014, Louis joined Margate, before later playing for Lowestoft Town, his 30th team.

Louis' next club was Wealdstone, whom he joined in December 2014. He scored 18 goals for the club in 57 league matches. On 3 June 2016, Staines Town announced that Louis had put pen to paper for them. On 13 October 2016, Oxford City manager Justin Merritt completed the signing of Louis. Caretaker boss since December, Mark Jones, released Louis at the end of the season after being appointed the permanent manager, and he subsequently joined local rivals Banbury United. During his time at United Louis became the first ever Banbury player to score 6 league goals in his first 6 games, breaking a 50-year-old record previously held by United's all-time top goalscorer Tony Jacques.

In December 2017 he moved to fellow Southern League Premier Division side Chesham United. He switched to Farnborough of the newly formed Southern Football League Premier South ahead of the 2018–19 season. On 15 September 2018 he returned to league rivals Chesham United for the 7th round of the season, as they were struggling at the bottom of the table. On 24 December 2019 he joined St Albans City. In the summer of 2020 he joined Southern Premier Division side Beaconsfield Town. In October 2021, he transferred to North Leigh.

International career
Louis represented Dominica in a 2010 World Cup qualifier against Barbados in March 2008, which Dominica lost 1–0. Louis played up front with his cousin Richard Pacquette in this match.

References

External links

1979 births
Living people
Footballers from Harrow, London
English footballers
People with acquired Dominica citizenship
Dominica footballers
Dominica international footballers
Association football forwards
Aylesbury United F.C. players
Thame United F.C. players
Oxford United F.C. players
Woking F.C. players
Ebbsfleet United F.C. players
Forest Green Rovers F.C. players
Bristol Rovers F.C. players
Hemel Hempstead Town F.C. players
Lewes F.C. players
Worthing F.C. players
Stevenage F.C. players
Eastleigh F.C. players
Yeading F.C. players
Havant & Waterlooville F.C. players
Weymouth F.C. players
Maidenhead United F.C. players
Mansfield Town F.C. players
Wrexham A.F.C. players
Crawley Town F.C. players
Rushden & Diamonds F.C. players
Gainsborough Trinity F.C. players
Darlington F.C. players
Hayes & Yeading United F.C. players
Lincoln City F.C. players
Newport County A.F.C. players
Whitehawk F.C. players
English Football League players
Isthmian League players
Southern Football League players
National League (English football) players
English people of Dominica descent
Lowestoft Town F.C. players
Margate F.C. players
Hendon F.C. players
Brackley Town F.C. players
Wealdstone F.C. players
Staines Town F.C. players
Farnborough F.C. players
Oxford City F.C. players
Banbury United F.C. players
Chesham United F.C. players
Hampton & Richmond Borough F.C. players
St Albans City F.C. players
Beaconsfield Town F.C. players
North Leigh F.C. players
Slough Town F.C. players
Sportspeople convicted of crimes
Black British sportspeople